In algebra, an SBI ring is a ring R (with identity) such that every idempotent of R modulo the Jacobson radical can be lifted to R. The abbreviation SBI was introduced by Irving Kaplansky and stands for "suitable for building idempotent elements" .

Examples
 Any ring with nil radical is SBI.
 Any Banach algebra is SBI: more generally, so is any compact topological ring.
 The ring of rational numbers with odd denominator, and more generally, any local ring, is SBI.

References

 

Ring theory